Yukiko Koga (born 1969) is an anthropologist teaching at Yale University. She previously taught at CUNY's Hunter College. She specializes in legal anthropology, urban space, post-colonial & post-imperial relations, history & memory, and transnational East Asia (China and Japan).

Education 
Koga was a postdoctoral scholar in East Asian Studies at Brown University, specializing in colonial and post-colonial culture of occupied regions like Manchuria and other parts of Mainland China directly after World War II. She received a National Endowment for the Humanities grant to complete this work.

Koga is the author of the book, Inheritance of Loss: China, Japan, and the Political Economy of Redemption After Empire (University of Chicago Press, 2016). In 2017, Koga won the American Anthropological Association’s Francis L. K. Hsu and Anthony Leeds Book Prizes.

She currently serves on the editorial collective of the Rice University journal positions: asia critique.

Awards 
 2018–2019 Princeton University Law and Public Affairs (LAPA) Scholar
 2018 Hunter College Presidential Award for Excellence
 2017 Francis L. K. Hsu Book Prize
2017 Anthony Leeds Book Prize

References

Living people
21st-century American anthropologists
American women anthropologists
Hunter College faculty
1969 births
21st-century American women